The 1969 kidnapping of the United States Ambassador to Brazil was the kidnapping of Charles Burke Elbrick by the National Liberation Action (ALN) and the October 8th Revolutionary Movement (MR8) in protest of the US-backed military dictatorship. Fernando Gabeira and  helped plan and execute the operation. In order to begin negotiations, the kidnappers demanded that their letter-manifesto be read and printed in the media, which was done. The ambassador was released after 78 hours in exchange for the release of 15 political prisoners imprisoned by the military dictatorship, who were exiled to Mexico. It was among the most high-profile guerrilla actions taken against the military dictatorship (1964-1985).

The 15 political prisoners left the Galeão Air Force Base for Mexico in a Lockheed C-130 Hercules belonging to the Brazilian Air Force. 

Thirteen of the 15 political prisoners released in exchange for the release of Ambassador Elbrick appeared in a photo taken before their exile in Mexico: Luís Travassos, José Dirceu, José Ibraim, and Rolando Fratti, standing up.

Fernando Gabeira described his experience in the book . It was made into the film Four Days in September, directed by Bruno Barreto.

References 

Brazil–United States relations
1969 in Brazil
Military dictatorship in Brazil
Kidnappings in Brazil